Luhman 16 (WISE 1049−5319, WISE J104915.57−531906.1) is a binary brown-dwarf system in the southern constellation Vela at a distance of approximately  from the Sun. These are the closest-known brown dwarfs and the closest system found since the measurement of the proper motion of Barnard's Star in 1916, and the third-closest-known system to the Sun (after the Alpha Centauri system and Barnard's Star). The primary is of spectral type L7.5 and the secondary of type  (and is hence near the L–T transition). The masses of Luhman 16 A and B are 33.5 and 28.6 Jupiter masses, respectively, and their ages are estimated to be 600–800 million years. Luhman 16 A and B orbit each other at a distance of about 3.5 astronomical units with an orbital period of approximately 27 years.

Discovery
The brown dwarfs were discovered by Kevin Luhman, astronomer from Pennsylvania State University and a researcher at Penn State's Center for Exoplanets and Habitable Worlds, from images made by the Wide-field Infrared Survey Explorer (WISE) Earth-orbiting satellite—NASA infrared-wavelength  space telescope, a mission that lasted from December 2009 to February 2011; the discovery images were taken from January 2010 to January 2011, and the discovery was announced in 2013 (the pair are the only two objects announced in the discovery paper). The system was found by comparing WISE images at different epochs to reveal objects that have high proper motions.

Luhman 16 appears in the sky close to the galactic plane, which is densely populated by stars; the abundance of light sources makes it difficult to spot faint objects. This explains why an object so near to the Sun was not discovered in earlier searches.

Discovery of companion

The second component of the system was also discovered by Luhman in 2013, and was announced in the same article as the primary. Its discovery image in the i-band was taken on the night of 23 February 2013 with the Gemini Multi-Object Spectrograph (GMOS) at the Gemini South telescope, Chile. The components of the system were resolved with an angular distance of 1.5 arcseconds, corresponding to a projected separation of 3 AU, and a magnitude difference of 0.45 mag.

Precovery
Although the system was first found on images taken by WISE in 2010–2011, afterwards it was precovered from the Digitized Sky Survey (DSS, 1978 (IR) & 1992 (red)), Infrared Astronomical Satellite (IRAS, 1983), ESO Schmidt telescope (1984 (red)), Guide Star Catalog (GSC, 1995), Deep Near Infrared Survey of the Southern Sky (DENIS, 1999), Two Micron All-Sky Survey (2MASS, 1999), and the AKARI satellite (2007).

On the ESO Schmidt telescope image, taken in 1984, the source looks elongated with a position angle of 138°. The similarity of this position angle with that of the resolved pair in the GMOS image (epoch 2013) in Fig. 1 of Luhman (2013) suggests that the time period between 1984 and 2013 may be close to the orbital period of the system (not far from original orbital period estimate by Luhman (2013)).

Name
Eric E. Mamajek proposed the name Luhman 16 for the system, with the components called Luhman 16A and Luhman 16B. The name originates from the frequently updated Washington Double Star Catalog (WDS). Kevin Luhman had already published several new discoveries of binary stars that have been compiled in the WDS with discovery identifier "LUH". The WDS catalog now lists this system with the identifier 10493−5319 and discoverer designation LUH 16.

The rationale is that Luhman 16 is easier to remember than WISE J104915.57−531906.1 and that "it seems silly to call this object by a 24-character name (space included)". The "phone number names" also include WISE J1049−5319 and WISE 1049−5319. Luhman–WISE 1 was proposed as another alternative.

As a binary object it is also called Luhman 16AB.

Astrometry

Position in the sky
Luhman 16 is located in the southern celestial hemisphere in the constellation Vela. As of July 2015, its components are the nearest-known celestial objects in this constellation outside the Solar System. Its celestial coordinates: RA = , Dec = .

Distance

Proximity to the Solar System
Currently Luhman 16 is the third-closest-known star/brown-dwarf system to the Sun after the triple Alpha Centauri system (4.37 ly) and Barnard's Star (5.98 ly), pushing Wolf 359 (7.78 ly) to the fifth place, along with the discovery of WISE 0855−0714. It also holds several records: the nearest brown dwarf, the nearest L-type dwarf, and possibly the nearest T-type dwarf (if component B is of T-type).

Proximity to Alpha Centauri
Both systems are located in neighboring constellations, in the same part of the sky as seen from Earth, but Luhman 16 is a bit farther away. Before the discovery of Luhman 16, the Solar System was the nearest-known system to Alpha Centauri.

Luhman 16 is closer to Proxima Centauri than to Alpha Centauri AB, just like Earth, despite the fact that Luhman 16 is located further from Earth than Alpha Centauri system. This is reflected in the fact that Luhman 16 has smaller angular distance to Proxima Centauri than to Alpha Centauri AB in Earth's sky, and this makes more contribution to the distance difference from Luhman 16 to Alpha Centauri than the distance difference between them and Earth.

Proper motion

The proper motion of Luhman 16 as published by Garcia et al. (2017), is about 2.79″/year, which is relatively large due to the proximity of Luhman 16.

Radial velocity
Since values of the radial velocity are positive, the system currently is moving away from the Solar System.

Orbit and masses
In Luhman 16's original discovery paper, Luhman et al. (2013) estimated the orbital period of its components to be about 25 years.

Garcia et al. (2017), using archival observations extending over 31 years, found an orbital period of 27.4 years with a semi-major axis of 3.54 AU. This orbit has an eccentricity of 0.35 and an inclination of 79.5°.

These results are consistent with all previous estimates of the orbit and component masses.

By comparing the rotation periods of the brown dwarfs with the projected rotational velocities, it appears that both brown dwarfs are viewed roughly equator-on, and they are aligned well to their orbits.

Age 
A 2013 paper, published shortly after Luhman 16 was discovered, concluded that the brown dwarf belongs to the thin disk of the Milky Way with 96% probability, and therefore does not belong to a young moving group. Based on lithium absorption lines the system has a maximum age of about 3–4.5 Gyr. Observations with the VLT showed that the system is older than 120 Myr.

However, in 2022, Luhman 16 was found to be a member of the newly discovered Oceanus moving group, which has an age of  Myr.

Search for planets
In December 2013, perturbations of the orbital motions in the system were reported, suggesting a third body in the system. The period of this possible companion was a few months, suggesting an orbit around one of the brown dwarfs. Any companion would need to be below the brown-dwarf mass limit, because it would otherwise have been detected through direct imaging. Researchers estimated the odds of a false positive as 0.002%, assuming the measurements had not been made in error. If confirmed, this would have been the first exoplanet discovered astrometrically. This would make it difficult to measure the astrometric movement of an exoplanet around it.

Subsequent astrometric monitoring of Luhman 16 with the Very Large Telescope has excluded the presence of any third object with a mass greater than  orbiting around either brown dwarf with a period between 20 and 300 days. Luhman 16 does not contain any close-in giant planets.

Observations with the Hubble Space Telescope in 2014–2016 confirmed the nonexistence of any additional brown dwarfs in the system. It additionally ruled out any Neptune mass objects with an orbital period of one to two years. This makes the existence of the previously found exoplanet candidate highly unlikely.

Atmosphere
A study by Gillon et al. (2013) found that Luhman 16B exhibited uneven surface illumination during its rotation. On 5 May 2013, Crossfield et al. (2014) used the European Southern Observatory Very Large Telescope (VLT) to directly observe the Luhman 16 system for five hours, the equivalent of a full rotation of Luhman 16B. Their research confirmed Gillon et al. observation, finding a large, dark region at the middle latitudes, a bright area near its upper pole, and mottled illumination elsewhere. They suggest this variant illumination indicates "patchy global clouds", where darker areas represent thick clouds and brighter areas are holes in the cloud layer permitting light from the interior. Luhman 16B's illumination patterns change rapidly, on a day-to-day basis. Luhman 16B is one of the most photometrically variable brown dwarfs known, sometimes varying with an amplitude of over 20%. Only 2MASS J21392676+0220226 is known to be more variable.

Heinze et al. (2021) observed variability in spectral lines of alkali metals such as potassium and sodium; they suggested that the variations were caused by changes in cloud cover, which changed the local chemical equilibrium with chlorides. Lightning or aurorae were deemed possible, but less likely.

Luhman 16B's lightcurve shows evidence of differential rotation. There is evidence of equatorial regions and mid-latitude regions with different rotation periods. The main period is 5.28 hours, corresponding to the rotation period of the equatorial region. Meanwhile, the rotation period of Luhman 16A is likely 6.94 hours.

Radio and X-ray activity
In a study by Osten et al. (2015), Luhman 16 was observed with the Australia Telescope Compact Array in radio waves and with the Chandra X-ray Observatory in X-rays. No radio or X-ray activity was found at Luhman 16 AB, and constraints on radio and X-ray activity were presented, which are "the strongest constraints obtained so far for the radio and X-ray luminosity of any ultracool dwarf".

See also
Substellar object

Notes

References

Further reading

 See related slideshow .

External links

WISE 1049-5319 AB at Solstation.com
"WISE Nabs the Closest Brown Dwarfs Yet Discovered" at Universe Today
"Checking Out Our New Neighbors" at Astrobites.org
 Nearest Brown Dwarf Might Remind You Of Jupiter AstroBob, 5/13/20

20130323
Binary stars
Local Bubble
L-type stars
T-type stars
Vela (constellation)
WISE objects
Articles containing video clips
J10491891-5319100
TIC objects